Drogou may refer to:

François Drogou (1904–1940), French naval officer
, a French warship in commission from 1976 to 2000